Vitaly Ivanovich Churkin (21 February 1952 – 20 February 2017) was a Russian diplomat. As a child actor, he starred in three films The Blue Notebook, Nol tri, and A Mother's Heart. Churkin served as Russia's Permanent Representative to the United Nations from 2006 until his death in 2017.

Previously he was Ambassador-at-Large at the Ministry of Foreign Affairs of the Russian Federation (2003–2006), Ambassador to Canada (1998–2003), Ambassador to Belgium and Liaison Ambassador to NATO and WEU (1994–1998), Deputy Foreign Minister and Special Representative of the President of the Russian Federation to the talks on Former Yugoslavia (1992–1994), Director of the Information Department of the Ministry of Foreign Affairs of the USSR/Russian Federation (1990–1992). Churkin was fluent in English, French and Mongolian.

Early life and career

Churkin was born in Moscow. In 1963, at age 11, he played Kolya Yemelyanov in the Lev Kulidzhanov film The Blue Notebook, about Vladimir Lenin. In 1964, he acted in a movie, Nol tri, about paramedics. In 1967, he played a peasant boy, Fedka, in Mark Donskoy's movie, A Mother's Heart, about Vladimir Lenin, and then he stopped his artistic career to concentrate on English language studies.

He graduated from the Moscow State Institute of International Relations in 1974, and began working for them then, and he received a PhD in History from the USSR Diplomatic Academy in 1981.  Subsequently, he was Director of the Information Department of the Ministry of Foreign Affairs of the Soviet Union and the Russian Federation. He also served as a spokesman for the Russian Foreign Ministry, and he was Deputy Foreign Minister from 1992 to 1994.

Churkin was Russia's Ambassador to Belgium from 1994 to 1998, and the Ambassador to Canada from 1998 to 2003. Subsequently, he served as Ambassador-at-Large at the Ministry of Foreign Affairs from 2003 to 2006. He replaced Andrey Denisov as the Permanent Representative to the United Nations on 1 May 2006, when he presented his credentials to the Secretary-General of the United Nations, Kofi Annan.  He was the Chairman of the Senior Officials of the Arctic Council.

Chernobyl testimony
Churkin won some notoriety in 1986 when, as a 34-year-old second secretary, he was selected by Soviet Ambassador Anatoly Dobrynin to testify before the United States Congress on the Soviet man-made Chernobyl disaster. This was reported as the first time in history a Soviet official had testified before a Congressional committee of the U.S. House of Representatives. The choice of Churkin, then a relatively junior diplomat, was due to his reputation as the most fluent English-speaker in the Soviet embassy; media reported he possessed "an array of English slang". Churkin's performance was filled with denials, deflections and whataboutist rhetoric, which led to his being parodied in Mark Alan Stamaty's Washingtoon, a political cartoon series in  The Washington Post, as Vitaly "Charmyourpantsoff".

Actions as a United Nations Representative

Georgia
In 2008, during the Russo-Georgian War, Churkin proposed a draft resolution imposing a weapons embargo on Georgia. The draft was criticized by the United States who saw it as "a ploy to divert attention from the fact Moscow had yet to pull out of Georgian territory outside two breakaway regions". The draft was officially introduced on 9 September 2009, and no actions were taken on it.

Crimea
On 13 March 2014, Churkin was questioned by Arseniy Yatsenyuk on whether Crimea had a right to hold a referendum which would determine Crimea's status as a part of either Russia or Ukraine.

On 20 March 2014, amid the impending annexation of Crimea by Russia, he responded to the CNN anchor Christiane Amanpour's criticism of him and his daughter, a state-funded Russia Today journalist Anastasia Churkina.

Iran
On 25 June 2014, Churkin commented on the first round of talks regarding the Iranian nuclear program, saying that the talks between the P5+1 states and Iran were successful. The talks were held by him and six other diplomats in Vienna from 16 to 20 June and he said that the second round would begin on 2 July and end thirteen days later.

Iraq
On 12 June 2014, Churkin briefed on the crisis in Baghdad, Iraq, saying that there was no threat to his colleague Nickolay Mladenov, who is the head of the UN's political mission in that country. He also noted that the violence there erupts further north.

Srebrenica massacre
During the Yugoslav Wars—in the Srebrenica massacre—about 7,500 people were killed by Bosnian Serb troops in a span of eleven days. It was later found to be an act of genocide by the International Court of Justice. The UK sponsored a resolution which would pronounce the Serbian people genocidal and commemorate the 20th anniversary of the massacre. The Russian Federation, after Serbian President Tomislav Nikolić sent a letter to Russian President Vladimir Putin, was the only country on the security council that was against the resolution (China and three other countries abstained): Churkin issued a veto on his country's behalf at the UN Security Council on 8 July 2015.

Career timeline
1974 – Graduated from the Moscow State Institute of International Relations
1974 – Joined the USSR Foreign Ministry
1974–1979 – Staff member of the USSR delegation to the Strategic Arms Limitation Talks
1979–1982 – Third secretary, US desk, USSR Foreign Ministry
1981 – PhD in history from the USSR Diplomatic Academy
1982–1987 – Second, first secretary, USSR Embassy in Washington DC
1985 – Undertook a speaking tour of United States universities invited by USGov
1987–1989 – Staff member, International Department, CPSU Central Committee
1989–1990 – Special adviser to the USSR Minister of Foreign Affairs
1990–1991 – Director, Information Department, Spokesman of the USSR Foreign Ministry
1992–1994 – Deputy Foreign Minister of the Russian Federation, Special Representative of the President of the Russian Federation to the talks on Former Yugoslavia
1994–1998 – Ambassador of Russia to Belgium, Liaison Ambassador to NATO and WEU
1998–2003 – Ambassador of Russia to Canada
2003 – April 2006 – Ambassador-at-Large, MFA, Chairman of Senior Arctic Officials, Arctic Council, Senior Official of Russia at the Barents/Euro-Arctic Council
8 April 2006 – Permanent Representative of Russia to the United Nations, Representative of the Russian Federation at the UN Security Council Diplomatic rank — Ambassador Extraordinary and Plenipotentiary (1990)

Death
Churkin died in New York City on 20 February 2017, the eve of his 65th birthday. The immediate cause was heart failure, according to Russian diplomat Sergei Ordzhonikidze. The Russian Foreign Ministry noted that Churkin died while at work and expressed condolences to Churkin's family. India's Permanent Representative to the UN, Syed Akbaruddin, also expressed his condolences, calling Churkin a "friend" and a "stalwart diplomat". Former President Barack Obama's UN Ambassador, Samantha Power, tweeted that she was "devastated" and described Churkin as a "diplomatic maestro" who did all he could to bridge U.S.-Russia differences. Britain's ambassador to the UN, Matthew Rycroft, tweeted that he was "absolutely devastated", describing Churkin as "a diplomatic giant & wonderful character".

On 21 February 2017, the New York City Medical Examiner's Office released the preliminary results of an autopsy performed on Churkin, which states that the cause of death needed further study, which often indicates the need for toxicology tests. A gag order pursuant to a request of the U.S. State Department and the United States Mission to the United Nations suppressed public disclosure of the cause and manner of death, citing Churkin's posthumous diplomatic immunity; Russia maintained that the information was private and that disclosing details of the autopsy results could hurt his reputation. Churkin was posthumously awarded the Russian Order of Courage on 21 February 2017 and the Order of the Serbian Flag 1st class.

Churkin was the fifth Russian diplomat posted abroad to die unexpectedly, in a remarkably similar fashion, since November 2016, the first such death having occurred on the morning of the U.S. presidential election, 8 November 2016, inside the Russian consulate in NYC, – a fact that caused conspiracy theorists to try to detect a pattern. The apparent pattern was followed by a sudden death of Russian ambassador to Sudan Migayas Shirinskiy in the capital Khartoum in August 2017. Hours after Shirinskiy's death, Russia's government-owned news agency TASS published a list of names and brief biographies of senior Russian diplomats (naming five), who had died "of natural causes" "in the past two years" (in fact, since 30 May 2016, the day when Russian Chargés d'affaires ad interim to Ukraine Andrei Vorobyov, aged 57, died suddenly in Moscow), that included Churkin. His death was likewise cited in a list published in early May 2017 by USA Today — as one in a series of "dozens of high-profile" Russians' deaths, such as GRU chief Igor Sergun's (January 2016), in "the past three years in Russia and abroad in suspicious circumstances".

See also
List of Permanent Representatives to the United Nations

References

External links

Russian mission to the UN
Vitaly Churkin

New Permanent Representative of the Russian Federation Presents Credentials – UN press release
Arctic Council home page

|-

|-

|-

1952 births
2017 deaths
Diplomats from Moscow
Russian diplomats
Soviet diplomats
Ambassador Extraordinary and Plenipotentiary (Soviet Union)
Permanent Representatives of Russia to the United Nations
Ambassadors of Russia to Belgium
Ambassadors of Russia to Canada
Moscow State Institute of International Relations alumni
Heads of mission of Russia to NATO
Diplomatic Academy of the Ministry of Foreign Affairs of the Russian Federation alumni
People of the annexation of Crimea by the Russian Federation
Soviet male film actors
Soviet male child actors
Russian male film actors
Russian male child actors
People involved in the Syrian peace process
Deniers of the Bosnian genocide
Burials in Troyekurovskoye Cemetery
Recipients of the Order of Honour (Russia)
Recipients of the Order of Courage
Recipients of the Order of Alexander Nevsky
Recipients of the Order "For Merit to the Fatherland", 4th class